Fryerstown is a small town in the Goldfields region of Victoria, Australia.

The Post Office opened on 19 April 1854 as Fryer's Creek, was renamed Fryerstown in 1856, and closed in 1975. Fryerstown Court House opened in 1879 and closed in 1930.

Fryerstown formerly had a police station, court, churches, school, hotels and various stores.  All are now closed and the nearest general store, church or petrol station is now at Chewton or Castlemaine.  There is a public hall.

References

External links
 Fryerstown - Maldon Castlemaine Victoria, Australia

Mining towns in Victoria (Australia)